Pyrgocythara annaclaireleeae is a species of sea snail, a marine gastropod mollusk in the family Mangeliidae.

Description

Distribution
This species occurs in the western Atlantic Ocean.

References

 García E.F. 2008. Eight new molluscan species (Gastropoda: Turridae) from the western Atlantic, with description of two new genera. Novapex 9(1): 1–15

External links

annaclaireleeae
Gastropods described in 2008